Cumayanı is a village in the central district (Karabük) of Karabük Province, Turkey. The population of Cumayanı is 2577 as of 2011. The village was founded recently. But there is an old mosque in the village which was an authorized to be the gathering place for the Friday prayers during the Ottoman Empire and the name of the village refers to Friday prayers (In Turkish Cuma means Friday)

References

Villages in Karabük Province
Karabük Central District